The 1925 Fresno State Bulldogs football team represented Fresno State Normal School—now known as California State University, Fresno—during the 1925 college football season.

Fresno State competed in the inaugural season of the Far Western Conference (FWC). The 1925 team was led by head coach Arthur W. Jones in his fifth year at the helm. They finished with a record of two wins, six losses and one tie (2–6–1, 0–4 FWC). The Bulldogs were outscored by their opponents 122–192 for the season.

Schedule

Notes

References

Fresno State
Fresno State Bulldogs football seasons
Fresno State Bulldogs football